Mahajana High School is a school located in Erode, a town in Tamil Nadu, India. 

In common with many schools in Tamil Nadu, it has been used as a polling station for general elections. Mahajana High School is also used as a ration card distribution centre. In 2005, parents complained about disruption caused by relocation of classes to the back yard, and by the large crowds of people seeking ration cards which the students found more interesting than their lessons.

In 1989 teacher Shri R. Soundara Rajan won a Teachers' Award from the Centre for Cultural Resources and Training, one of 49 such awards presented that year.

References

High schools and secondary schools in Tamil Nadu
Schools in Erode district
Education in Erode